The Governor José Richa Hydroelectric Plant, formerly known as Salto Caxias, is a dam and hydroelectric power plant on the Iguazu River near Caxias in Paraná, Brazil. It is the first dam upstream of the Iguazu Falls and was constructed between 1995 and 1999. The power station has a  capacity and is supplied with water by a roller-compacted concrete gravity dam.

It is owned and operated by Copel who renamed it after José Richa, governor of Paraná between 1983 and 1986.

José Richa Dam
It is the eighth largest of its type in the world. The dam's designer, Intertechne Consultores Associados, along with Copel decided on an RCC design as it would be 25% cheaper than an embankment dam. Cracks were noticed in the dam during inundation in 1998 and Copel announced a plan to repair them in 2005. On the western portion of the dam, 15 sluice gates feed water from the reservoir into the power plant's intake channel.

Power plant
Each generator is power by a vertical-shaft Francis turbine manufactured by Kvaerner.

Resettlement program
25% of the dam's $1 billion cost was involved in a resettlement program for the 1,000 families displace by the reservoir. The program included building community centers, roads, churches along with paying for healthcare, environmental protection and land provisions.

See also

List of power stations in Brazil

References

Energy infrastructure completed in 1999
Hydroelectric power stations in Paraná (state)
Dams in Paraná (state)
Dams on the Iguazu River
Roller-compacted concrete dams
Gravity dams
Dams completed in 1999
1999 establishments in Brazil